Darrell Wayne 'Tricky' Trindall (born 16 February 1972) is an Australian former rugby league footballer who played in the 1990s and 2000s.

Background
Trindall was born in Narrabri, New South Wales, Australia.

Career
He rose through the ranks to become club captain at South Sydney Rabbitohs in 1997-98. He scored 328 points and played 150 first grade games with the Rabbitohs before finishing his NRL career at the Canterbury-Bankstown Bulldogs.

He played for the Australian Aboriginal team at the 1992 Pacific Cup, being named in the team of the tournament.

In 2003, Trindall played for one season in the Intrust Super Premiership NSW for Newtown.

Personal life
In August 2002, Trindall was charged with assault occasioning actual bodily harm and high-range drink driving after an alleged assault in the Bulldogs club car park, which left a 36-year-old woman in hospital with head injuries.

In August 2003, Trindall pleaded guilty to indecently assaulting a long time friend at a pub in Sydney's CBD.  Trindall allegedly punched the woman in the face three times and held her in a headlock four times.  He then said "I'm a first grade footballer. Who are they going to believe, you or me?".  Trindall later received a 12 month suspended jail sentence for the attack.

In April 2012, Trindall pleaded not guilty to assaulting a police officer in January 2012.  The assault allegedly took place in Sydney's Eastern Suburbs.

In 2020, Trindall was remanded on charges of common assault, stalking or intimidating in a domestic violence context, and two counts of assault occasioning bodily harm.

References

External links
Bulldogs profile
Saints Heritage Society profile

1972 births
Living people
Australian Aboriginal rugby league team players
Australian rugby league players
Canterbury-Bankstown Bulldogs players
Indigenous Australian rugby league players
Newtown Jets NSW Cup players
Rugby league five-eighths
Rugby league fullbacks
Rugby league halfbacks
Rugby league players from Narrabri
South Sydney Rabbitohs players
St Helens R.F.C. players
South Sydney Rabbitohs captains